Grinning Guns is a 1927 American silent Western film directed by Albert S. Rogell and written by Grover Jones. The film stars Jack Hoxie, Ena Gregory, Robert Milasch, Arthur Morrison, George B. French and Dudley Hendricks. The film was released on May 22, 1927, by Universal Pictures.

Cast    
 Jack Hoxie as 'Grinner' Martin
 Ena Gregory as Mary Felden
 Robert Milasch as Buckaroo Bill
 Arthur Morrison as Harvey Purcell
 George B. French as Amos Felden 
 Dudley Hendricks as Sheriff
 Alphonse Martell as Tony the Dude
 Scout as Scout

References

External links
 

1927 films
1920s English-language films
1927 Western (genre) films
Universal Pictures films
Films directed by Albert S. Rogell
American black-and-white films
Silent American Western (genre) films
1920s American films